Odumbe is a surname. Notable people with the surname include:

Edward Odumbe (born 1965), Kenyan cricketer
Maurice Odumbe (born 1969), Kenyan cricketer 

Surnames of Kenyan origin